István Szikora (born 5 March 1964) is a Hungarian boxer. He competed in the men's super heavyweight event at the 1992 Summer Olympics.

References

External links
 

1964 births
Living people
Hungarian male boxers
Olympic boxers of Hungary
Boxers at the 1992 Summer Olympics
People from Mátészalka
Super-heavyweight boxers
Sportspeople from Szabolcs-Szatmár-Bereg County